The Green Domino is a 1935 French/German drama film directed by Henri Decoin and Herbert Selpin, based on play by Erich Ebermayer. It tells the story of a rich heiress who falls in love with an art critic after his wife has been murdered. It was released on DVD in France on 5 April 2007.

Cast

Danielle Darrieux as Hélène de Richemond / Marianne
Charles Vanel as Nebel
Maurice Escande as Henri Bruquier, le critique d'art
Daniel Lecourtois as Naulin
Marcel Herrand as M. de Richemond
Jany Holt as Lily Bruquier
Jeanne Pérez
Henri Beaulieu as Monsieur de Fallec, Hélène's uncle
Marcelle Géniat as Mademoiselle de Fallec, Hélène's aunt
André Burgère as Robert Zamietti
Henri Guisol
Georges Douking
Henry Bonvallet
Lucien Dayle
Jeanne Pérez

External links

Le Domino vert at Cinema.nl
Le Domino vert at AlloCiné 
Le Domino vert at Evene.fr

French black-and-white films
1935 films
1935 drama films
Films directed by Herbert Selpin
French multilingual films
Films directed by Henri Decoin
Films with screenplays by Marcel Aymé
French drama films
German drama films
German black-and-white films
1935 multilingual films
1930s French films
1930s German films